Hockessin is a census-designated place (CDP) in New Castle County, Delaware, United States. The population was 13,478 at the 2020 Census.

History
Hockessin came into existence as a little village in 1688 when several families settled in the area. The village was named after the Lenape word hokes, meaning good bark or good bark hill. There is a second and more likely origin for the name. While the word Hockessin does look like a Native American word, the name Hockessin did not show up on any early maps until many years after the Hockessin Meeting House was built and what is now the Village of Hockessin was never settled by the Native Americans, while they did have a hunting camp nearby. There was no town name Hockessin and the area was referred to as Mill Creek Hundred. The actual name is believed to be derived from one of the first settled properties which was named Occasion and settled by William Cox in 1726 and also the location of the first Quaker meetings in the area before Hockessin Meeting House was built a few years later. The earliest known use of the word Occasion was in 1734 in a property deed for this property. And the road to the Hockessin Meeting House, currently Old Wilmington Road, was written as Ockession Road on a map in 1808. The first Roman Catholic church in Delaware was located in Hockessin. Missionary priests from Maryland established the Coffee Run Mission in 1790.

The A. Armstrong Farm, Coffee Run Mission Site, Hockessin Friends Meetinghouse, T. Pierson Farm, Public School No. 29, Springer Farm, and Wilmington and Western Railroad are listed on the National Register of Historic Places in 1978. More recently added sites to the National Register of Historic Places include: Tweed's Tavern, the home of Negro league baseball player James "Nip" Winters, Colored School #107C, St. John the Evangelist Church, the Daniel Nichols house, and the Cox/Phillips/Mitchell Agricultural Complex.

Geography
The community is near the northwestern border of Delaware, within  of the Pennsylvania border on the east bank of Mill Creek.

Demographics

As of the census of 2000, there were 12,902 people, 4,464 households, and 3,731 families residing in the CDP. The racial makeup of the CDP was 88.8% White, 2.7% African American, 0.2% Native American, 7.2% Asian, <0.1% Pacific Islander, 0.5% from other races, and 0.8% from two or more races. Hispanic or Latino of any race were 2.0% of the population. From 1990 to 2016, the population of Hockessin has grown by about 35%.

There were 4,464 households, out of which 40.1% had children under the age of 18 living with them, 77.3% were married couples living together, 4.5% had a female householder with no husband present, and 16.4% were non-families. 13.9% of all households were made up of individuals, and 8.9% had someone living alone who was 65 years of age or older.  The average household size was 2.83 and the average family size was 3.13.

In the CDP, the population was spread out, with 26.9% under the age of 18, 4.7% from 18 to 24, 24.5% from 25 to 44, 28.7% from 45 to 64, and 15.3% who were 65 years of age or older.  The median age was 42 years. For every 100 females, there were 95.6 males.  For every 100 females age 18 and over, there were 91.9 males.

The median income for a household in the CDP was $100,844, and the median income for a family was $108,784. Males had a median income of $76,617 versus $46,988 for females. The per capita income for the CDP was $40,516.  About 1.0% of families and 1.7% of the population were below the poverty line, including 2.0% of those under age 18 and 1.3% of those age 65 or over.

Economy
Although Hockessin is primarily a bedroom community, there are several mushroom farms operating in the area.

Hockessin contains the Lantana Square Shopping Center, and the Hockessin Athletic Club, which contains a pool, indoor gym, and walking trail.

Arts and culture

Hockessin hosts several Fourth of July activities for the area residents. Local groups parade down Old Lancaster Pike, neighborhoods compete in different athletic events, and there is a fireworks display in the evening in Swift Park.

Education
Hockessin is served by the Red Clay Consolidated School District for public education.

Elementary schools serving Hockessin for grades K through 5 include Cooke Elementary School and North Star Elementary School. Public school students in grades 6 through 8 attend Henry B. duPont Middle School, Cab Calloway School of the Arts, or Conrad Schools of Science. CCSA and Conrad also enroll students from grades 9–12. Students in grades 9 through 12 in Hockessin attend Thomas McKean High School to the south of Hockessin or Alexis I. duPont High School in Greenville, with students in the western part of Hockessin attending John Dickinson High School in Pike Creek. Private schools in Hockessin include CACC (Chinese American Community Center) Montessori School, Hockessin Montessori School, Sanford School, and Wilmington Christian School.

Infrastructure

Transportation
The main road through Hockessin is Delaware Route 41 (Lancaster Pike) which heads southeast toward Wilmington and northwest toward the Pennsylvania border, where it becomes Pennsylvania Route 41 and continues toward Lancaster. South of Hockessin, Delaware Route 48 splits from DE 41 to follow Lancaster Pike to Wilmington while DE 41 continues along Newport Gap Pike to Prices Corner. Delaware Route 7 passes through the western part of Hockessin along Limestone Road, heading north to the Pennsylvania border and south toward Pike Creek and Christiana. The northern terminus of the Wilmington and Western Railroad, a tourist railroad, is in Hockessin; the railroad follows the Red Clay Creek valley south to Greenbank. DART First State provides bus service to Hockessin along Route 20, which follows Lancaster Pike to Wilmington and ends at the Wilmington station served by Amtrak and SEPTA Regional Rail's Wilmington/Newark Line. DART First State's Route 20 bus serves park and ride lots located at Hockessin Memorial Hall and the Wells Fargo bank.

Notable people
 Neilia Hunter Biden, the first wife of Joe Biden, the 46th  president of the USA
 Delsworth Buckingham, Delaware state representative
 Cab Calloway, jazz singer and bandleader
 Chris Coons, US Senator from Delaware
 Matt Denn, Lieutenant Governor of Delaware
 Trevon Duval, basketball player for the Duke Blue Devils
 Tony Graffanino, Major League Baseball player
 Bernard Hopkins, professional boxer
 Kent A. Jordan, Federal Judge on the United States Court of Appeals for the Third Circuit

References

External links

Hockessin, Delaware profile on City-Data.com

Census-designated places in New Castle County, Delaware
Census-designated places in Delaware
Populated places established in 1688
Delaware placenames of Native American origin